The Swiss Warmblood, also called the Einsiedler, is a  horse breed, founded in the 10th century on the local Schwyer stock.  It was first bred at the Benedictine Monastery of Einsiedeln.  They are now raised at the Federal Stud at Avenches.

Origins 
This horse was founded in the 10th century, but then improved in the 19th century by Anglo-Norman mares and a Yorkshire Coach Horse stallion named Bracken.  The breed's most important bloodlines are from Anglo-Norman horses.  The three most important of them were Ivoire, Que d'Espair, and Orinate de Messil.  The Swedish Warmblood Aladin also had a strong influence on the Swiss Warmblood, along with two Holsteiners, Astral and Chevalier.

After World War II Sweden disbanded its cavalry and all but 500 of its old Warmbloods (in Sweden called half-bloods) were slaughtered.  Those 500 left were sold to the Swiss Government.

Breed characteristics 
The Swiss Warmblood generally stands between 15.1 and 16.2 hands high, and their coat may be any color except pinto and appaloosa.  The breed has a well-proportioned head with a straight or slightly convex profile.  The chest is broad and deep and the shoulders sloping and long.  They have prominent withers, a straight back, and a slightly sloping croup.  The legs are strong, and have well-defined tendons and good joints.

Uses 
Swiss Warmblood horses are often used for riding.  They are suitable for all sorts of riding.  Also, the Swiss Warmblood is an ideal cavalry troop horse.

Breeding 
To breed, these horses need to go through tests.

The stallions are tested at  years old and then again at 5 years old.  In testing they have to go through jumping courses, dressage, cross-country, and driving.  Stallions are only selected if their parents have proven performance ability.

Swiss Warmblood mares are tested at 3 years of age.  They cannot be registered unless their parents are registered as half-breeds.

References 

Horse breeds
Horse breeds originating in Switzerland
Warmbloods